Alfred Frederick Pilkington (22 April 1901 – 27 August 1986) was an English first-class cricketer active 1925–28 who played for Surrey. He was born in Camberwell; died in Epsom.

References

1901 births
1986 deaths
English cricketers
Surrey cricketers